The 1988 edition of The Winston was a stock car racing competition that took place on May 22, 1988. Held at Charlotte Motor Speedway in Concord, North Carolina, the 135-lap race was an exhibition race in the 1988 NASCAR Winston Cup Series. Darrell Waltrip of Hendrick Motorsports won the pole and led the most laps (50), but it was Terry Labonte of Junior Johnson & Associates who won the race.

Background

The Winston was open to race winners from last season through the 1988 Winston 500 at Talladega Superspeedway. Because the field did not meet the minimum requirement of 19 cars, the remaining spots were awarded to the most recent winning drivers prior to the 1987 season. Richard Petty lost his eligibility when Phil Parsons won the Talladega race a week earlier.

Tim Richmond opted not to participate in the race due to a then-ongoing legal dispute with NASCAR after he was suspended for testing positive for banned substances early that year. He died of complications from AIDS on August 13, 1989.

The 1988 season saw the first of two tire wars between Goodyear and Hoosier. For this race, NASCAR allowed teams to switch between both tire brands once during pit stops.

1988 The Winston drivers and eligibility

Race winners in 1987 and 1988
3-Dale Earnhardt (12 wins from 1987 and 1988)
9-Bill Elliott (7 wins from 1987 and 1988, including the 1987 Daytona 500)
11-Terry Labonte (2 wins from 1987 and 1988)
17-Darrell Waltrip (1 win in 1987)
21-Kyle Petty (1 win in 1987)
22-Bobby Allison (2 wins from 1987 and 1988, including the 1988 Daytona 500)
25-Tim Richmond (2 wins in 1987) - withdrawn
26-Ricky Rudd (2 wins in 1987)
27-Rusty Wallace (2 wins in 1987)
28-Davey Allison (2 wins in 1987)
55-Phil Parsons (1 win in 1988)
75-Neil Bonnett (2 wins in 1988)
83-Lake Speed (1 win in 1988)

Race winners from previous years, not eligible by the above criteria
5-Geoff Bodine (2 wins in 1986, including the 1986 Daytona 500)
8-Bobby Hillin Jr. (1 win in 1986)
29-Cale Yarborough (2 wins in 1985)
33-Harry Gant (3 wins in 1985)
47-Morgan Shepherd (1 win in 1986)
50-Greg Sacks (1 win in 1985)

Winner of The Winston Open
44-Sterling Marlin

Race summary
As the race broadcast was using a boxing motif, the segments were referred to as "rounds".

Round 1 (75 laps)
Sterling Marlin made the starting grid by winning the Winston Open. Bodine and Phil Parsons served as the onboard camera cars throughout the race. Waltrip and Bodine were first and second during the first five laps before the first caution was triggered by Greg Sacks blowing an engine and spilling oil on the track. Shortly after the restart on lap 9, Waltrip extended his lead over Bodine and the rest of the field. Davey Allison took the lead from Waltrip on lap on lap 34. The yellow flag was waved again on lap 49, when Cale Yarborough's engine expired. Harry Gant retired on lap 52 due to oil pan issues. Parsons blew an engine and was eliminated on lap 57. A precise strategy during the green-flag pit stop saw Dale Earnhardt take the lead. With one lap to go, Davey Allison closed in on Earnhardt until he reclaimed the lead on lap 74 and concluded Round 1 by collecting . Following the end of the round, Earnhardt blew a right-front tire and slammed the turn one wall, requiring major repairs during the 10-minute intermission.

Round results
28-Davey Allison ($20,000)
3-Dale Earnhardt
17-Darrell Waltrip

Round 2 (50 laps)
At the start of Round 2, Earnhardt's repaired car overtook Davey Allison, but quickly fell back as Waltrip, Davey Allison, and Terry Labonte overtook him. Lake Speed then took the lead from Waltrip halfway through the round. The caution was triggered on lap 98, when Ricky Rudd lost control and slammed the turn two wall; he collapsed after exiting his car and was rushed to the infield care center. He sustained a torn ligament on his right knee from the accident. Round 2 ended with Elliott, Speed, and Marlin in the top three. During the 10-minute intermission, Davey Allison's pit crew installed a new rear end differential, but NASCAR ordered them to reinstall the old unit. Bodine was forced to retire after his pit crew were unable to resolve an engine problem.

Round results
9-Bill Elliott ($20,000)
83-Lake Speed
44-Sterling Marlin

Round 3 (10 laps)
Elliott and Speed duked it out at the beginning of the 10-lap shootout until Speed lost momentum and tagged the turn two wall while Labonte challenged Elliott for the lead. Both Rusty Wallace and Bobby Hillin Jr. experienced engine problems and retired. Marlin took second place from Elliott and slowly closed in on Labonte. In the end, Labonte extended his lead and crossed the finish line to win the race and collect .

References

Winston, The
Winston, The
NASCAR races at Charlotte Motor Speedway
NASCAR All-Star Race